José Gamarra (born 1934 in Tecuarembó, Uruguay) is an Uruguayan painter who has lived in Paris, France, since 1963.

Artwork 
His paintings are usually landscapes, with a dreamlike tropical universe. Grand forests, lianas, troubled waters, and living anacondas and caimans are often placed in historical or incongruous scenes.

His favourite theme is the denunciation of colonialism, with caravelles and helicopters present in an otherwise harmonious scene emphasising their indesirable presence.

Notes 
 Dictionnaire Culturel d'Amérique Latine. Jean-Paul DUVIOLS. Ellipses

References 

Uruguayan painters
Uruguayan male artists
Living people
1934 births
Male painters